Pushpa Bhusal Gautam is a Nepali advocate, politician and former deputy speaker of the House of Representatives of the federal parliament of Nepal. She was elected from Nepali Congress in the parliament.

Previously, she had contested the 2013 constituent assembly election under the first-past-the-post system from Arghakhanchi-2 constituency, but was defeated.

References

Living people
Place of birth missing (living people)
21st-century Nepalese women
People from Arghakhanchi District
21st-century Nepalese politicians
Nepali Congress politicians from Lumbini Province
Nepal MPs 2017–2022
Members of the 1st Nepalese Constituent Assembly
1961 births